Paul Matthew Jessup (born August 24, 1977) is a United States writer of short stories, novels, poetry, and plays. He is also a video game designer, and solo developer/pixel artist for Riddle Fox Games, creator of the best selling game Bad Writer.

His short stories have had honorable mentions in several year's best anthologies, including Year's Best Horror, and the Year's best Fantasy and Horror, and Year's Best Science Fiction. His work has been translated into several different languages, with Open Your Eyes being published in Polish. His writing blurs genre lines, and frequently mixes fantasy, science fiction, and horror, and infuses them with a folkloric sensibility that borders on magical realism and surrealism.

In 2000 he was awarded Kent States Virginia Perryman Award for Excellence in Freshman Short Fiction.

Personal life
Paul Jessup was born in the small town of Geneva, Ohio, where he would spend his days exploring the woods and reading at the local library. He got his first taste for publication by entering numerous short story contests and winning quite a few. He'd achieved a blue ribbon at the local 4h festival for several short stories, going onto the state 4H fair and winning more. Every single day he worked on short stories and novel ideas, focusing mostly on science fiction and fantasy. When he was twelve he was given a classic horror anthology that he'd become obsessed with, and tried to imitate for many years soon after.

Even at a young age he became obsessed with making video games. He would combine writing and sketching to make video games out of cardboard and graph paper with colored pencils. When his family got a Tandy computer, he learned Tandy Color Basic and started making very primitive games with it. In highschool, he took a class on QBasic, and then joined the QBRPG community, making SNES style RPG's in QBasic with other, like minded coders on Geocities. From there, he learned C++ and Allegro, making games for DOS. After awhile of doing this, he put it aside and decided to just focus on writing. The next few years were filled with a hurricane of short fiction and short novellas.

Out came his collection of short stories Glass Coffin Girls, and then two novellas and later, a novel. He returned to game programming later on, creating the label Riddle Fox Games for his publishing efforts. It took him a bit to learn some of the new engines, languages and tools, but once he did he released his first game, Emberglass, the same year his novel The Silence that Binds came out from Vernacular Books. The next year he released the video game Bad Writer, drawing on all of his years writing and selling short stories. It went on to become a best seller on Itch.io and then was ported to the Nintendo Switch.

Disability and Multiple Sclerosis
In 2008 Paul Jessup had his first attack of optic neuritis, which eventually led to his diagnosis of Multiple Sclerosis. Over the years he began walking with a cane, and slowly lost eyesight in left eye. In 2021 he was then diagnosed with Diabetes as well.

Books 
 The Silence that Binds (2021, published by Vernacular Books)
 Close Your Eyes (2018, published by Apex Books)
 Glass Coffin Girls (2009, published by PS Publishing)
 Werewolves (2010, published by Chronicle Books)
 Open Your Eyes (2009, published by Apex Books) (2013 published in Alamanach Fantastyki by Solaris, translated into Polish by Miroslaw Obarski)
 AngelWings and FinerThings: A Dream (2000, published by Six Gallery Press)

Poetry 
 All the houses on Sesame Street are haunted houses (2013, published in Interfictions)
 That time I said hello to you, and you thought I was a bear (2012, published in Word Riot)
 The Basement (1997, published in Ashtabula Star Beacon)
 Red Dirt (1997, published in Ashtabula Star Beacon)
 Beware the Glass Rabbit (1998, published by Six Gallery Press)

Nonfiction 
 A Wave on the Sea (2018, published in Apex Magazine)
 Surviving Times of Stagnation (2017, published in SFWA
 Post-Novel Blues (2018, published in SFWA)
 Finding Your Tribe (2017, published in SFWA)
 Someone Changed the Bones in Our Homes (2017, published in Nightmare Magazine)
 The Rebirth of Grue (2008, published in Strange Horizons)
 Confessions of a Red Mage (2008, published in Strange Horizons)
 Standing Still, Falling Behind (2008, published in Erie Life Magazine)

Short fiction
 The Skinless Man Counts to Five (2022 published in Apex Magazine)
 The Last Dryad (2022 published in Disabled Destroy Science Fiction)
 The Music of Ghosts (2018 published in Interzone Magazine)
 The Days of Talking Mountains (2015 published in Farrago’s Wainscot)
 Summer Cannibals (2013 published in The Big Click)
 Sunsorrow (2013 published in Swords & Mythos Anthology, 2016 audio version at Far Fetched Fables)
 Red Dust from His Boots (2012 published in Alien Sky Anthology)
 Orange Cuts (2012, published in Dadaism Anthology)
 PostFlesh (2012, published in Future Lovecraft)
 Cannibal Choir (2011, published in Coffin Mouth Magazine)
 Stone Dogs (2011, published in Candle in the Attic Window)
 And Out Came the Words of Fire (2011, published in Inssmouth Free Press)
 A Futile Gesture Towards Truth (2010, published in Dark Faith Anthology)
 Heaven's Fire (2010, published in Sybil's Garage)
 The Last Stand of the Antmaker (2010, published in Apex Magazine)
 The Adventures of Petal (2009, published in Fantasy Magazine)
 A Word Without Ghosts (2009, published in Fantasy Magazine)
 Secret in the House of Smiles (2008, published in Clarkesworld Magazine)
 The Sea of Dead Around Her (2008, published in Postscripts magazine)
 The Ghosts We Have Become (2008, published in Postscripts magazine)
 Ghost Technology From the Sun (2008, published in Postscripts magazine)
 The Ghosts We Have Become (2008, published in Postscripts magazine)
 Mudskin (2008, published in Postscripts magazine)
 Light Like Knives Dragged Across the Skin (2008, published in Pseudopod)
 Fingerbones Hung Like Mobiles (2008, published in Pseudopod)
 Philianion (2008, published in Behind the Wainscot)
 Mister Waterbones and His Wife (2008, published in Farrago's Wainscot)
 Apple Magick (2008, published in Farrago's Wainscot)
 Postflesh (2008, published in Apex Magazine)
 The Happiness of Pinned Wings (2008, published in Graveyards Yawned Anthology)
 The Alchemy of War (2008, published in Electric Velocipede)
 Happiness of Pinned Wings (2006, published in Graveyard's Yawn)
 The Gods Have Left Us (2006, published in Flashing Swords)
 Dream Thief (2006, published in The Harrow)
 When Max Was Hungry Again (2006, published in The Harrow)
 Clockwork: The Mechanical Nature of Humanity (2001, published in Journals of Experimental Fiction)
 Key 12 (2000, published in Journals of Experimental Fiction)
 Lunar Verses (2001, published in Jacob's Ladder Anthology)

Editor 
 Hatter Bones (2010, ENE Press)
 Grendelsong (2004-2008 (print), 2015-2016 (online))
 Coffinmounth (2010)

References

External links

Interviews
Paul Jessup “Open Your Eyes” Interview(October 2009)
Paul Jessup “Open Your Eyes” Interview(April 2009)
Paul Jessup “Fantasy Magazine” Interview(March 2009)
Paul Jessup interviewed for "Naked Street Theatre" (February 2011)

1977 births
Living people
20th-century American novelists
21st-century American novelists
American male bloggers
American bloggers
American fantasy writers
American male novelists
American horror writers
People from Geneva, Ohio
American male short story writers
20th-century American short story writers
21st-century American short story writers
20th-century American male writers
21st-century American male writers